Bryce Street (born 25 January 1998) is an Australian cricketer.

In April 2016, he was awarded a rookie contract with Queensland ahead of the 2016–17 season. He made his first-class debut on 18 October 2019, for Queensland in the 2019–20 Sheffield Shield season. Two weeks before his first-class debut, Street made the highest individual total in Second XI cricket in Australia, scoring 345 runs against Victoria. He made his List A debut on 31 October 2019, for Queensland in the 2019–20 Marsh One-Day Cup. On 4 November 2019, Street scored his maiden first-class century, with 115 runs against Western Australia.

Street was upgraded to a full contract with Queensland ahead of the 2020–21 season.

In December 2021, Street represented Australia A against the England Lions, scoring an unbeaten 119 in the second innings of the first-class match between the two sides at Ian Healy Oval.

References

External links
 

1998 births
Living people
Australian cricketers
Queensland cricketers
People from Gosford
Cricketers from New South Wales